Pusing (Jawi: ڤوسيڠ) is a small town in Kinta District, Perak, Malaysia.

Village (Kampung)/Housing Area (Taman)
 Railway Reserve 
 Kampung Baru Gunung Hijau
 Taman Medan Pusing
 Taman Pelangi
 Taman Gunung Hijau
 Kampung Pinang A 
 Kampung Pinang B 
 Kampung Papan 
 Kampung Papan Baru 
 Taman Pusing Murni
 Taman Cenderawasih
 Taman Pusing Mutiara
 Bandar Baru Puspa
 Taman Pusing Baru
 Taman Pusing Mewah
 Medan Pusing Saujana
 Taman Pusing Perdana
 Taman Batu Gajah Perdana
Taman Pusing Delima

Ethnography
80% of the residents are ethnically Chinese of Cantonese and/or Hakka origin, and the rest are Malay, Indian or others.

Educational

Primary Schools: Sekolah Kebangsaan Pusing, Sekolah Jenis Kebangsaan (Cina) Yit Chee, Sekolah Jenis Kebangsaan (Cina) Gunung Hijau.

Secondary School: SMK Pusing.

Facilities

 Pusing Post Office, Lahat Road, 31550 Pusing.
 Pusing Police Station, Batu Gajah Road, 31550 Pusing.
 Perpustakaan Umum Pusing (Pusing Public Library)

Religion

 Masjid Hasni
 Tham Sen Temple
 Gurdwara Sahib
 Sri Muneeswarar Temple
 Methodist Church

Notable people

Jeffrey Cheah, founder and chairman of the Sunway Group.

Kinta District
Towns in Perak